The Pioneer BDR-101A was the world's first PC compatible Blu-ray Disc recorder. It utilized an ATAPI connection and complied with the then latest specifications for BD-R (Blu-ray Disc recordable), BD-RE (Blu-ray Disc rewritable) and BD-ROM (Blu-ray Disc read-only memory).  The drive began shipping on May 17, 2006.  It supports a data transfer rate of 72 Mbit/s (2x) for both reading and writing making it possible to record over two hours of a high-definition (HD) video (at 24Mbit/s transfer rate) on a single disc.  The drive was available only in beige.
, the retail price was around US$1,000.

References

Computer peripherals